The Hunger Games: Songs from District 12 and Beyond is the official companion album for the 2012 film The Hunger Games. The score for the film was composed by James Newton Howard, but the companion album consists primarily of songs by various artists inspired by, but not heard in, the film. "Safe & Sound", by Taylor Swift featuring The Civil Wars, was released as a  promotional single for the soundtrack and is one of the three songs on the album used in the film, alongside "Abraham's Daughter" by Arcade Fire and "Kingdom Come", also by The Civil Wars. On February 14, 2012, "One Engine" was made available for download on iTunes. "Eyes Open", also by Taylor Swift, was released as the soundtrack's first official single on March 27, 2012. Swift performed the song live in Auckland, New Zealand on her Speak Now World Tour. The album debuted atop the U.S. Billboard 200 chart, and has also charted in the United Kingdom, New Zealand, Australia, and Ireland.

Promotion
The soundtrack was released on March 20, 2012. The soundtrack track listing was revealed on iTunes on February 13, 2012. Jennifer Lawrence singing "Rue's Lullaby" is not included in the soundtrack.  On February 14, 2012, "One Engine" was released as the first promotional single by iTunes. A bonus song, "Deep in the Meadow (Lullaby)", by Sting, was included as a bonus download with purchase of the soundtrack.

Charts performance
The soundtrack debuted at number 1 on the Billboard 200 with 175,000 copies sold on its first week. It sold 100K digital copies the next week, making it the highest one-week total for a theatrically released movie soundtrack in digital history. It has been certified as Gold by the RIAA since April 27, 2012.  It sold 463,000 copies in 2012 in the US and was the best-selling soundtrack album of the year. As of November 22, 2013, the album has sold 481,000 copies in the US.

Track listing

iTunes digital album
A digital version of the album, available for purchase on iTunes, includes a digital booklet with artwork and images from The Hunger Games.

Grammy and Golden Globe nominations
The songs "Abraham's Daughter" and "Safe & Sound" were nominated for the 2013 Grammy Awards; the first for Best Song Written for Visual Media, and the second for Best Country Duo/Group Performance and also for Best Song Written for Visual Media, latter of which it ended up winning. "Safe & Sound" was also nominated for the Golden Globe Award for Best Original Song at the 2013 ceremony.

Charts and certifications

Weekly charts

Year-end charts

Certifications

References

External links
 
 Soundtrack at Taylor Swift official site: includes lyrics for tracks "Safe & Sound", "Eyes Open"
 

The Hunger Games music
2012 soundtrack albums
Albums produced by T Bone Burnett
Albums produced by Taylor Swift
Albums produced by Nathan Chapman (record producer)
Adventure film soundtracks
Science fiction film soundtracks